The Stade Belvédère, or Stade du FUS, is a multi-use stadium in Rabat, Morocco. It is used mostly for football matches and hosts the home games of FUS de Rabat of the GNF 1. The stadium holds 15,000 spectators.

External links
Stadium information  
StadiumDB.com images

Football venues in Morocco
Fath Union Sport
Buildings and structures in Rabat